Tourism in the Netherlands is a relatively small sector of the country's economy with a total contribution of 5.4% to gross domestic product and 9.6% to employment. In 2017 the Netherlands was visited by 17 million foreign tourists (with more than 5 million coming from Germany), making it the 20th most visited country in the world.

Arrivals by country

Within Europe
Most visitors staying in all forms of accommodation in the Netherlands on short-term basis are from the following countries of nationality with the majority of tourists coming from within Europe itself.

Other continents
In 2017, the United States (1,414,000 tourists, a 20% growth from the 1,182,000 Americans who visited in 2016), China (364,000 tourists, a 22% growth from the 297,000 of 2016), and Canada (180,000 tourists, a 16% growth from the 155,000 Canadians tourists of 2016) are the major non-European homelands of international tourists coming to the Netherlands. The total of foreign tourists visiting the Netherlands in 2017 was 17,924,000, a 13% growth from the 15,829,000 foreign people who visited the country in 2016.

See also 
List of castles in the Netherlands
List of museums in the Netherlands

References

External links 

 National Board of Tourism
 
 nbtc.nl – Organisation responsible for promoting the Netherlands nationally and internationally

 
Netherlands